Richard A. Diehl (born 1940) is an American archaeologist, anthropologist and academic, noted as a scholar of pre-Columbian Mesoamerican cultures. He is particularly renowned for his extensive contributions in the study of the Olmec civilization, which flourished in the Gulf Coast of Mexico region during the Formative (or Preclassic) period in Mesoamerican chronology and widely influenced subsequent Mesoamerican cultures. Diehl retired from formal academia at the end of the 2007 academic year, after a career spanning over four decades. He retained title as Professor Emeritus in the Department of Anthropology at the University of Alabama (UA), Tuscaloosa. Post-retirement Diehl continues to be active in Mesoamerican and archaeological research, teaching classes and authoring publications on the Olmec and other archaeological subjects.

Early life and academic career
Richard Diehl was born in Bethlehem, Pennsylvania. He completed his secondary education in the state system before pursuing tertiary studies at Pennsylvania State University. After first graduating with a BA in History, Diehl commenced postgraduate studies in anthropology. In 1965 Diehl obtained his MA under the supervision of prolific archaeologist William T. Sanders, with a thesis on "The Use of Ethnographic Data for Archaeological Interpretation of the Teotihuacan Valley, Mexico". Continuing to specialise in Mesoamerican archaeology, Diehl received his PhD in 1969, with a thesis entitled "An Evaluation of Cultural Evolution in the Formative Period in Mesoamerican Prehistory", again with Sanders as his supervisor.

Diehl began his academic career with the University of Missouri (MU) in Columbia, Missouri. In 1968 he was accepted for a teaching position at MU's Department of Anthropology, which had been newly established as a separate department two years previously. Diehl remained at MU for the next 18 years, lecturing and conducting archaeological research in Guatemala and Mexico.

In 1986 Diehl left MU to join the anthropology department at Alabama as its departmental chair, a position he held until 1993. During a one-year sabbatical in 1993–94 Diehl served as acting director and curator of pre-Columbian Studies at the Dumbarton Oaks Research Library and Collection, in Washington, D.C. From 1998 to 2005 Diehl served as executive director of UA's museum systems, and was director of the Alabama Museum of Natural History.

Research
Diehl's experiences in archaeological fieldwork began in the early 1960s while still an undergraduate at Penn State. From 1961 to 1964 he participated in field trips to the Teotihuacan Valley, the important archaeological locality situated in the central Mexican altiplano where the major city and polity of Teotihuacan had reached its apogee during the Classic era. Working under the tutelage of Sanders, Diehl conducted research at Teotihuacan and other nearby sites towards his master's degree, gaining experience in excavation techniques, archaeological field surveys and ethnography. As a graduate working towards his doctorate,  Diehl worked with Yale professor Michael D. Coe in the 1966–67 field season at San Lorenzo Tenochtitlán, a major Olmec site in the state of Veracruz, Mexico.

Notes

References

External links
 
 Richard A. Diehl, faculty profile at Department of Anthropology, UA
 

American archaeologists
American Mesoamericanists
Mesoamerican archaeologists
Olmec scholars
Teotihuacan scholars
1940 births
People from Bethlehem, Pennsylvania
20th-century Mesoamericanists
21st-century Mesoamericanists
Living people
University of Alabama faculty
Pennsylvania State University alumni
University of Missouri faculty